Sandra Beasley (born May 5, 1980, in Vienna, Virginia) is an American poet and non-fiction writer.

Background
Beasley graduated from Thomas Jefferson High School for Science and Technology, earned a B.A. in English magna cum laude from the University of Virginia, and later received an MFA degree from American University. For several years she worked as an editor at The American Scholar before leaving the position to write full-time.

Beasley is the author of the poetry collections Theories of Falling (New Issues, 2008) and I Was the Jukebox, (W.W. Norton,  2010), as well as the memoir Don't Kill the Birthday Girl: Tales from an Allergic Life (Crown, 2011), which is also a cultural history of food allergies. Her poetry has been anthologized in The Best American Poetry 2010, Poetry Daily, Verse Daily, and Best New Poets 2005, as well as such journals as Poetry, The Believer, AGNI online, Blackbird, Barrelhouse, Copper Nickel, Gulf Coast, and Black Warrior Review. She was a regular contributor to the "XX Files" column for the Washington Post Magazine and more recently her prose has appeared in the Wall Street Journal  and Psychology Today. She has received fellowships to the University of Mississippi (as the Summer Poet in Residence), the Sewanee Writers' Conference (Walter E. Dakin Fellowship), and Virginia Center for the Creative Arts (two Cafritz Fellowships), among others honors. She serves on the Board for the Writer's Center and is also a member of the Arts Club of Washington.

Honors and awards
 2015 Cavafy Prize from Poetry International
 2010 Summer Poet in Residence fellowship at the University of Mississippi
 2010 LegalArt Residence
 2010 Artist Fellowship from the DC Commission on the Arts and Humanities
 2009 Friends of Poetry Prize from the Poetry Foundation
 2009 Cafritz Fellowship to Virginia Center for Creative Arts
 2009 Barnard Women Poets Prize, selected by Joy Harjo
 2008 Walter E. Dakin Fellowship to the Sewanee Writers' Conference
 2008 Maureen Egen Exchange Award from Poets & Writers
 2007 New Issues Poetry Prize, selected by Marie Howe
 2006 Elinor Benedict Poetry Prize from Passages North at Northern Michigan University
 2005 Cafritz Fellowship to Virginia Center for Creative Arts

Published works

Translated works
 Die Abtastnadel in der Rille eines traurigen Lieds. Selected poems. Bilingual edition (German, English). Berlin: Hochroth Press, 2011. pp. 28.

References

External links
 Author's website
 Author's "Chicks Dig Poetry" blog
 Interview: "Q&A: Sandra Beasley says allergies can bring out insensitivity in others" The Globe & Mail July 19, 2011
 Interview: "Sandra Beasley: On Food Allergies, Rituals, and Inclusion"> Her Circle > Shana Thornton, July 12, 2011
 Interview: "Jake Adam York Interviews Sandra Beasley" Southern Spaces September 22, 2011.
 Poems: The Plays of Lilliput; The Mangrove House; The Parade, Delaware Poetry Review
 Poems: The Angels; My Los Alamos; Fireproof, Coconut 8

Poets from Virginia
People from Vienna, Virginia
University of Virginia alumni
American University alumni
Living people
Poets from Washington, D.C.
1980 births
American women poets
Thomas Jefferson High School for Science and Technology alumni
21st-century American poets
21st-century American women writers
American women non-fiction writers
21st-century American non-fiction writers